Karl Grob (30 May 1946 – 20 April 2019) was a Swiss professional footballer who played as a goalkeeper. Grob is considered to be a legend for Zürich, as he was there for 20 years and helped the team win a total of five Swiss Super Leagues and four Swiss Cups.

Professional career
Grob was a left-winger with FC Küsnacht before switching to a goalkeeper. Grob is the record holder for FC Zürich in appearances in the Swiss Super League, in European tournament, and in total appearances.

International career
Grob made seven appearances for the Switzerland national football team, the first in a 4–0 Euro 1968 qualification loss to Italy on 23 December 1967.

Death
Grob died of heart failure on 20 April 2019 in Zürich, at the age of 72.

Honours
Zürich
 Swiss Super League: 1967–1968, 1973–1974, 1974–1975, 1975–1976, 1980–1981
 Swiss Cup: 1969–1970, 1971–1972, 1972–1973, 1975–1976

References

External links
 DbFCZ Profile
 
 

1946 births
2019 deaths
People from Küsnacht
Swiss men's footballers
Switzerland international footballers
Swiss Super League players
FC Zürich players
Association football goalkeepers
Sportspeople from the canton of Zürich